A Beautiful Daughter-in-law Era is a 2009 Chinese emotional drama directed by Liu Jiang which broadcast on Beijing Television and Dragon Television and from March 2010 to April 2010. It stars Hai Qing and Huang Haibo. The series was produced by Beijing HualuBaina Film & TV Company Limited, Shanghai Media Group in association with Beijing Media Network. It is base on the novel of the same name by Wang Liping. The series follows the story of an ordinary family life in urban areas of China.

Cast

Main
 Hai Qing as Mao Doudou
 Huang Haibo as Yu Wei

Supporting
 Lin Shen as Mao Feng, Mao Doudou's younger brother.
 Bai Han as Cao Xinmei, mother of Yu Wei and Yu Hao.
 Liu Lili as Wang Shenghong, mother of Mao Doudou and Mao Feng.
 Li Guangfu as Mao Jianhua, father of Mao Doudou and Mao Feng.
 Yue Yue as Yu Hao, Yu Wei's younger sister.
 Zhang Jianing as Pan Meili, Pan Fenghuang's younger sister.
 Ji Qilin as Yu Hongshui, father of Yu Wei and Yu Hao.
 Gao Baobao as Yao Jing, Yu Hongshui's second wife.
 Shi Yanjing as Yang Shu, Cao Xinmei's second husband.
 Feng Jiayi as Li Ruoqiu
 Liang Jingke as Qin Susu, Mao Feng's ex-wife.
 Li Kunlin as Yang Yifan, Yang Shu's son with his former wife.

Soundtrack

Broadcasts
A Beautiful Daughter-in-law Era was first dubbed in Swahili and broadcast across East African countries in 2011.
The Arabic-dubbed version of A Beautiful Daughter-in-law Era was broadcast in Iraq in September 2019.

Awards and nominations

References

External links
 
 
 

2010 Chinese television series debuts
2010 Chinese television series endings
Television shows based on Chinese novels
Chinese romantic comedy television series